George M. Wertz (July 19, 1856 – November 19, 1928) was a Republican politician, teacher and publisher from Pennsylvania.

Formative years and family
George Munson Wertz was born near Johnstown, Pennsylvania on July 19, 1856. He attended the public schools, Ebensburg Academy and the National Normal School in Lebanon, Ohio. 

His father, German-Dunkard Jacob Wertz, an ardent Republican and abolitionist, was the great grandson of a 1735 Palatine immigrant and rose to prominence as a farmer.

His daughter Ada Olive Hager (née Wertz) attended Vassar, graduating in 1908. She was one of the original graveyard suffragettes.

Career
A teacher in his community's public school system from 1876 to 1884, George M. Wertz was elected as a Republican member of the Board of School Directors in 1890. As he progressed in his political career, he became chair of his county's Republican Party committee.

In 1893, Wertz began a three-year term as Cambria County commissioner, and in November 1897, Cambria County sheriff, a position he held until 1901. Through the influence of his iron manufacturer father-in-law, Wertz assumed a post as manager of the Cambria Steel Company, where his accomplishments included securing options for control of the Manufacturer's Water Company, Somerset County. 

A member of the Pennsylvania State Senate from 1909 to 1913, he served as the body's President pro tempore from 1911 to 1913. 

Wertz later organized and ran the Johnstown Daily Leader from 1911 to 1917, creating Cambria County's first afternoon newspaper. He was also an ardent farmer and fruit grower.

Wertz was elected to the Sixty-eighth Congress, but was defeated in the 1924 Republican primary.  

He belonged to the Evangelical Lutheran Church; the Summit Lodge Masons; the Johnstown School of Instruction – Masons; and was knighted by the Oriental Commandery, No. 61, Knights Templar.

Death and interment
Wertz sold real estate until his death in Johnstown on November 19, 1928. He was interred in the Grandview Cemetery, Johnstown.

References

The Political Graveyard

Presidents pro tempore of the Pennsylvania Senate
Republican Party Pennsylvania state senators
Pennsylvania sheriffs
Schoolteachers from Pennsylvania
American newspaper founders
Politicians from Johnstown, Pennsylvania
1856 births
1928 deaths
Republican Party members of the United States House of Representatives from Pennsylvania
Journalists from Pennsylvania
Cambria County Commissioners (Pennsylvania)